Dithiolium salts are compounds of the formula [(RC)3S2]+X− (R = H, alkyl, aryl, etc.).  These salts consist of a planar organic cation with a variety of anions such as halides.  The five-membered ring cations are observed in either of two isomers, 1,2- and 1,3-dithiolium cations. These cations differ with respect to the relative positions of the pair of sulfur atoms.  Both isomers feature a planar ring, which is aromatic owing to the presence of 6π electrons. For example, the 1,2-ditholium ring can be represented as an allyl cation of the three carbons, with each sulfur atom donating one of its lone pairs of electrons to give a total of three pairs.

Preparation, occurrence, reactions
1,2-Dithiolium cations have been prepared from 1,3-diketones by treatment with H2S and oxidants such as bromine.  

1,3-Dithiolium cations are often prepared by alkylation of the corresponding unsaturated dithio- or trithiocarbonates:

The analogous reaction of electrophiles with 1,2-dithiole-2-ones affords 1,2-dithiolium cations.

References

Organosulfur compounds
Aromatic compounds